Winton Motor Raceway is a motor racing track in Winton, near Benalla, Victoria, Australia.

History
The Benalla Auto Club began planning for a permanent racing track around 1958, as a replacement for their existing track at Barjarg. In 1960 it was decided to build the track at Winton Recreation Reserve and the track was completed in twelve months. The circuit hosted its first race meeting on 26 November 1961. The circuit was immediately popular - a March 1965 meeting featuring the Neptune touring car and the Victorian Formula Two championship drew a crowd of approximately 10,000 spectators. The circuit length was extended prior to the 1997 round of the V8 Supercar championship and the upgrade included a new pit complex.

The circuit 
Winton Motor Raceway has a combination of long fast straights and twisty and tight bends. It is also known as "Australia's Action Track". Dick Johnson once described the circuit being "like running a marathon around your clothes-line".

The long circuit is called the Winton National Circuit.

Layouts

V8 Supercars

The track was used as a round in the V8 Supercar series, hosting the Winton SuperSprint. The track was one of the more popular tracks in the series with spectators, especially those who live in the area. Easy access to the track and viewing areas made it very popular. It attracts some of the biggest crowds of any of the permanent race tracks in the series.

Although the circuit held various rounds of national championships such as the Australian Drivers' Championship and the Australian Sports Car Championship, Winton was not awarded a round of the Australian Touring Car Championship until the start of the Group A era in Australia in 1985. The first ATCC race was won by then triple-Bathurst 1000 winner Jim Richards in his JPS Team BMW 635 CSi. That race holds its place in ATCC/V8 Supercar history as not only the first all-Group A race in Australia, but the first ATCC win by BMW and the only race in history in which there were no Holdens on the grid.

Richards holds the record for most ATCC round wins at Winton with four, having won in 1985 and 1986 for BMW, while winning in 1990 and 1991 for Nissan.

Australian Drivers' Championship
Winton has played host to 19 rounds of the Australian Drivers' Championship since 1980.

* The 1989 Australian Drivers' Championship was contested over ten rounds at five race meetings at five different tracks. Although the races were held on the same day both Rohan Onslow and John Briggs are credited with separate round wins.**The 2009 round saw two heats. Tim Macrow and Joey Foster each won a heat while also finished second on the other heat giving the pair equal points (35) on the day.

Australian Sports Car Championship
Winton played host to a round of the Australian Sports Car Championship on 7 occasions between 1978 and 1985.

Australian Sports Sedan / GT Championship
1980, 1981, 1997, 1998 and 2003 were run for Sports Sedans. 1982–1985 were run for GT style cars.

Australian Nations Cup Championship

Australian Superbike Championship
Winton Raceway is one of the most prominent Superbike races on the Australian Superbike Championship racing calendar. Winton Raceway has seen riders such as Mick Doohan, Kevin Magee and Mat Mladin ride regularly at the venue.

Formula X-treme Motorcycle Championship

Drift Attack
Winton Raceway is one of Australia's most popular Drift circuits. It hosts Australia largest drift event Drift Attack. Drift Attack is promoted by the Victorian Drift Club and offers the largest Prize Pool in Australian Drifting and is contested by Australia's 32 best Drifters in the Pro class and 32 Drivers in the street class.

Lap records

As of July 2022, the official race lap records at Winton Motor Raceway are listed as:

National Circuit

Notes

References

External links
Official raceway website
Map and circuit history at RacingCircuits.info

Motorsport venues in Victoria (Australia)
Supercars Championship circuits
Sports venues in Victoria (Australia)